The Elias Hinshaw House is a historic home located at 16 West Main Street (US 40) in Knightstown, Henry County, Indiana.  The house is built in Italian Villa style and was constructed in 1883.  The main feature of the house is a four-story central tower. The house is of two-story brick construction on a raised basement.

It was added to the National Register of Historic Places in 1984. The Elias Hinshaw House is located in the Knightstown Historic District.

References

External links 
 Link to National Register of Historic Places for Henry County - http://www.nationalregisterofhistoricplaces.com/IN/Henry/state.html

Houses completed in 1883
Knightstown, Indiana
Houses on the National Register of Historic Places in Indiana
National Register of Historic Places in Henry County, Indiana
Houses in Henry County, Indiana
Historic district contributing properties in Indiana